Gerard Johnson may refer to:

Gerard Johnson (musician) (born 1963), British keyboard player best known for his work with Saint Etienne and The Syn
Gerard Johnson (sculptor), Anglo-Dutch artist of the 17th century best known for his memorial to Shakespeare
Gerard Johnson the elder (died 1611), Dutch sculptor
Gerard Johnson (director), British film director of the films Tony (2009) and Hyena (2014)

See also
Gerald Johnson (disambiguation)
Jerry Johnson (disambiguation)